South Koroba Rural LLG a local-level government (LLG) of Koroba-Kopiago District in Hela Province, Papua New Guinea.

Wards
01. Magara 1
02. Erebo
03. Magara 1
04. Hedemari 1
05. Hedemari 2
06. Humburu 1
07. Humburu 2
08. Kakarane 1
09. Kakarane 2
10. Gunu 1 Council - (Mitago Atali) 
11. Gunu 2 Council - (Kulupara) 
12. Pandu - Council (Peter Wau Tapaya) 
13. Maria
14. Andiriai 1 - Council ( Urulu Eka)
15. Koroba Station - Council (Andapa) 
16. Andiriai 2 - Council (Ignatus Ingiti)
17. Kundugu
18. Tangimabul
19. Tumbite
20. Pabulumu 1
21. Egele 1
22. Egele 2
23. Mbuli
24. Teria 1 - Council (Kei Hinupi)
25. Teria 2--Council (Nele)

References 

Local-level governments of Hela Province